The 2010–11 season is East Bengal Football Club's 4th season in the I-League, and also marks the club's 91st season. East Bengal will seek to win their first league trophy for 6 seasons, competing in the I-League, the Federation Cup and the AFC Cup.

Players

Current squad
For the 2010–11 season.

[Captain]

Coach: Trevor Morgan
Asst coach: Tushar Rakshit
Goalkeeper coach: Atanu Bhattacharya
Team doctor: Dr. S R Dasgupta
Team manager: Swapan Ball, Gopal Ghosh

Transfers

In:

Out:

Stadiums
East Bengal F.C. have been using both the Salt Lake Stadium and the East Bengal Ground sense Salt Lake Stadium opened in 1984. As of today the Salt Lake Stadium is used for East Bengal's I-League, AFC Cup, and Federation Cup games. The East Bengal Ground is used for the Calcutta Football League matches.

Kit
Main Sponsor: Kingfisher (Parent Company United Breweries Group is 50% stake holder in the club).
Co-sponsor: Tower Group
Co-sponsor: Saradha Group

Competitions

Overall

Overview

Calcutta Football League

Fixtures & results

Federation Cup

Group A

Fixtures & results

Durand Cup

Group D

Fixtures & results

Platinum Jubilee Cup

Fixtures & results

Super Cup

Last year's Federation Cup Champion East Bengal faced last year's I-League Champion Dempo in the Super Cup.

Fixtures & results

I League

League table

Results summary

Fixtures & results

IFA Shield

Fixtures & results

AFC Cup

Group stage

Fixtures & results

Statistics

Appearances 
Players with no appearances are not included in the list.

Goal scorers

References

East
East Bengal Club seasons